National Administration of Traditional Chinese Medicine is a state administration of the People's Republic of China under the jurisdiction of the National Health Commission (formerly the National Health and Family Planning Commission), responsible for the regulation of traditional Chinese medicine industry.

The current director is Wang Guoqiang.

History 
A section for TCM was present in the PRC's Central Ministry of Health formed in 1949. The section was gradually extended to have more power, and in 1986 the State Council decided to form a NATCM.

The role and composition of NATCM was adjusted in 1998.

A larger change came about in 2018 as the State Council restructured the bureaucracy.

Scope

References

External links 
 

Government agencies of China
Medical and health organizations based in China
Traditional Chinese medicine